Hypermastia may refer to:

 Accessory breasts
 Breast hypertrophy